Ron Dellow (13 July 1914 – 7 November 2013) was an English footballer and coach. As a player, he was a right-winger who began his professional career at Blackburn Rovers, and later played for Mansfield Town, Manchester City and Tranmere Rovers in the years before World War II. In August 1939, he joined Carlisle United, but because of the war, he had to wait seven years before making his debut for the club in an official league game. He played one post-war season for Carlisle.

During the Second World War, Dellow served in the RAF. In 1948, Dellow moved to the Netherlands. He coached HVV Helmond, Holland Sport, FC Volendam between 1964 and 1969, and guided the club to promotion to the Eredivisie in 1967. He also coached GVAV, Heracles Almelo and Helmond Sport in the 1970s.

After retiring from football, Dellow spent his retirement years in Almelo. He died on 7 November 2013, aged 99.

References

1914 births
2013 deaths
English footballers
English football managers
English expatriate football managers
English expatriate sportspeople in the Netherlands
Blackburn Rovers F.C. players
Mansfield Town F.C. players
Manchester City F.C. players
Tranmere Rovers F.C. players
Carlisle United F.C. players
Hermes DVS managers
FC Volendam managers
Heracles Almelo managers
Helmond Sport managers
HBS Craeyenhout football managers
Blauw-Wit Amsterdam players
Royal Air Force personnel of World War II
SVV Scheveningen managers
Expatriate football managers in the Netherlands
Association football midfielders